Scott Gemmill (born 9 June 1987) is a Scottish former footballer who played as a forward.

Career
Raised in East Kilbride, Gemmill was selected for the Lanarkshire Schools XI in 2002 alongside future Scotland international forward Steven Fletcher, while a pupil at Duncanrig Secondary School. He began his club career with St Mirren, where he made 10 appearances, all as a substitute, scoring no goals. His debut on 9 August 2003 against Raith Rovers at the age of 16 years 61 days made him St Mirren's youngest ever first team player, breaking a mark set by Ricky Gillies; this record still stands.

He was allowed to leave Saints in June 2007, and dropped down to the Scottish Second Division to join Berwick Rangers. He made 30 appearances for Berwick, scoring 8 goals, before leaving the club after one season in June 2008.

Gemmill joined Scottish First Division side Clyde in July 2008, signing a one-year contract. He made his debut a day later, in a 2–0 victory over Annan Athletic in the Scottish Challenge Cup. He scored his first goal for Clyde on 30 August 2008, in a 3–2 victory over St Johnstone. He was released by Clyde in June 2009 along with other out of contract players, due to the club's financial position.

Gemmill went on to join Airdrie United, quickly re-joining the club after being released following their relegation from the Scottish First Division in 2010 and playing regularly for two seasons (64 appearances, 18 goals), but left the Diamonds permanently at the end of 2010–11.

Statistics
Correct as of 16 January 2009

References

External links

1987 births
Living people
Scottish footballers
Scottish Premier League players
Scottish Football League players
St Mirren F.C. players
Berwick Rangers F.C. players
Clyde F.C. players
Airdrieonians F.C. players
Association football forwards
Sportspeople from East Kilbride
Footballers from South Lanarkshire